Preston Robert Tisch (April 29, 1926 – November 15, 2005) was an American businessman who was the chairman and—along with his brother Laurence Tisch—was part owner of the Loews Corporation. From 1991 until his death, Tisch owned 50% of the New York Giants football team and shared ownership of the team with Wellington Mara.

Early life
Tisch was born in 1926 in the Bensonhurst section of Brooklyn, the son of Sadye and Al Tisch. Tisch received a BA degree in economics from the University of Michigan in 1948, and his wife Joan Tisch and his daughter also received degrees at the university. While in college Tisch was a member of Sigma Alpha Mu, a Jewish fraternity.

Career
On August 16, 1986, he was appointed Postmaster General of the United States Postal Service, serving until March 1, 1988.

In 1991, Tisch purchased fifty percent of the New York Giants of the National Football League. The team had been owned by the Mara family since the team’s founding, but the stakes were split at the time between Wellington Mara and his brother Jack’s family, with Jack’s son Tim given control of his father’s share upon his death. Tim was ill at the time, fighting Hodgkin’s disease, and no longer desired to participate in the team’s operations; Tisch and Tim’s family would eventually come to terms on the purchase of their share of the team shortly after the Giants won Super Bowl XXV. During his time as owner, Tisch contributed to the business operations of the team, using his experiences as an executive to manage the team's front office. As an executive, Tisch also served on the NFL's Finance and Super Bowl Policy committees.

Tisch held the share until he died on November 15, 2005, from brain cancer. Tisch's death followed Wellington Mara's death by three weeks and that of his brother, Laurence, by exactly two years. His share of the Giants passed to his son Steve, who co-owns the team with Mara's son John.

Tisch was posthumously inducted into the New York Giants' Ring of Honor in 2010.

Business career
Tisch began his career in business when he opened a hotel, the Grand Hotel in 1946, with his brother, Larry. After years of losing money the hotel burnt down under suspicious circumstances. The brothers continued to expand their hotel business, building the Americana Hotel in Bal Harbor in 1957, designed to attract convention business, one of the first such hotels in the country. Later on, he successfully led the hospitality and hotel industry to a large expansion between the 1960s and 1970s.

Tisch also served for 19 years as chairman of the New York Convention and Visitors Bureau, also known as NYC & Company, which spearheaded NYC’s “The Big Apple” campaign and popularized the New York City nickname. He eventually purchased stock in Loew's Inc. in 1958, owning the company beginning in 1959, and creating Loew's Corporation as a parent company of Loew's Theatres and Loew's Hotels in 1970. Bob was named president and Chief Operating Officer of Loews in 1968. Both Bob and his brother retired as co-CEOs of Loews on December 31, 1998. Loews eventually diversified into fields such as insurance and natural gas.

Philanthropy

Tisch made substantial donations to his alma maters, leading to these institutions naming buildings and a school after him. Tisch Hall, on the University of Michigan central campus, houses that university's history department. New York University's Tisch School of the Arts and NYU Medical Center's Tisch Hospital are named after Laurence A. and Preston Robert Tisch. NYU's Preston Robert Tisch Center for Hospitality, Tourism, and Sports Management was founded in 1995 and expanded in 1999 to meet the needs of a growing student population. In 1997, the Central Park Zoo opened the Tisch Children's Zoo.

Given two months to live by his New York doctors, Tisch lived for 14 more months under care at Duke University Medical Center. In recognition of their efforts, the Tisch family donated $10 million to the Duke Brain Tumor Center which was renamed the Preston Robert Tisch Brain Tumor Center in October 2005.

The Tisch Building in New York City, which is the headquarters of the Gay Men's Health Crisis (GMHC), is named for him and his wife, who is on the GMHC Board of Directors, after they donated $3.5 million for it in March 1997. There is additionally a Preston R. Tisch Professorship in Judaic Studies and the Preston Robert Tisch Tennis Building at the University of Michigan. Tisch was also a founding member of the Association for a Better New York, which took on the task of tackling city problems that had previously fallen to the city's agencies. He additionally helped to found Citymeals on Wheels and personally served meals to the city's elderly. There is a Tisch Center for the Arts at the 92Y in New York, and Tisch Galleries at the Metropolitan Museum of Arts. Tisch founded the charity Take the Field, which raised $135 million in public and private funds to repair 43 athletic fields in New York City.

Awards and honors
1982 – Golden Plate Award of the American Academy of Achievement
1995 – Frank W. Berkman Tourism Achievement Award
2000 – Hospitality Industry Hall of Honor, Conrad N. Hilton College, Hilton University of Houston
2010 – The Events Industry Council Hall of Leaders

In 2007, the University at Albany, where the Giants held training camp for many years, named their practice field after Tisch and co-owner Wellington Mara.

Personal life
In 1948, he married Joan Hyman. They had three children: Steve Tisch, Jonathan Tisch, and Laurie Tisch.

References

External links
 

1926 births
2005 deaths
American billionaires
American financiers
Philanthropists from New York (state)
New York Giants owners
United States Postmasters General
Deaths from cancer in New York (state)
Ramaz School alumni
University of Michigan College of Literature, Science, and the Arts alumni
Sportspeople from Brooklyn
Preston Robert Tisch
Jewish American sportspeople
Deaths from brain cancer in the United States
Burials at Westchester Hills Cemetery
Reagan administration personnel